Southern Seaplane Airport  is an airport and seaplane base located two nautical miles (4 km) northwest of the central business district of Belle Chasse, in Plaquemines Parish, Louisiana, United States.

Facilities and aircraft 
Southern Seaplane Airport has one runway designated 2/20 with a 3,200 by 40 ft (975 x 12 m) asphalt pavement. It also has one seaplane landing area designated 2W/20W which measures 5,000 by 100 ft (1,524 x 30 m). There are 28 aircraft based at this airport: 89% single-engine and 11% multi-engine.

References

External links 
 

Airports in Louisiana
Seaplane bases in the United States
Transportation in the New Orleans metropolitan area
Transportation in Plaquemines Parish, Louisiana
Airports in the New Orleans metropolitan area